Tryst is a collaborative studio album by Australian recording artists Kate Ceberano and Paul Grabowsky, released on 3 May 2019. The album is a collection of love song and reinterpretations from the past 50 years.

At the ARIA Music Awards of 2019 it won Best Jazz Album.

At the AIR Awards of 2020, the album won Best Independent Jazz Album or EP.

Background and release
In 1999 Kate Ceberano and Paul Grabowsky performed a one-off show at The Continental in Melbourne for Valentine's Day. That performance would grow a close and enduring friendship. The album is a set of songs revisiting the theme of the impact of love and loss we all endure.

Reception
Jeff Jenkins from Stack Magazine said "Tryst is the perfect title for this romantic rendezvous, a collection of late-night love songs... this is a magical combination, Ceberano's peerless voice and Grabowsky's exquisite piano playing".

Track listing

Release history

References

2019 albums
ARIA Award winners
Kate Ceberano albums
Paul Grabowsky albums
Covers albums